The Achille Duquesne House, at 710 W. Midway in Filer, Idaho, was built in 1912.  It was listed on the National Register of Historic Places in 1993.

It is built of cast concrete blocks with rocklike faces.  It has cast stone lintels and window sills.  Its design is eclectic, including Gothic Revival-style window surrounds and a Queen Anne-style plan.

References

		
National Register of Historic Places in Twin Falls County, Idaho
Residential buildings completed in 1912
Houses on the National Register of Historic Places in Idaho